Esquimalt—Saanich was a federal electoral district in British Columbia, Canada, that was  represented in the House of Commons of Canada from 1953 to 1988.

This riding was created in 1952 from parts of Nanaimo riding.

It was abolished in 1987 when it was redistributed into Esquimalt—Juan de Fuca and Saanich—Gulf Islands  ridings.

It consisted of the southern part of Vancouver Island and off-shore islands.

Members of Parliament

Election results

See also 

 List of Canadian federal electoral districts
 Past Canadian electoral districts

External links
Riding history from the Library of Parliament

Defunct British Columbia federal electoral districts on Vancouver Island